Bukovščica (previously Klemen or Sveti Klemen) is a village in the Municipality of Škofja Loka in the Upper Carniola region of Slovenia.

Church

The local church is dedicated to Saint Clement. Its rectangular nave indicates Romanesque origins, but the church was rebuilt several times. There is a fresco of Saint Christopher on the south wall of the sanctuary painted by Janez Gosar (1830–1887). Some of the frescoes were painted by Jernej of Loka. The main altar dates to 1851 and the Stations of the Cross are by Leopold Layer.

References

External links 

Bukovščica at Geopedia

Populated places in the Municipality of Škofja Loka